Michael Currie may refer to:
Michael Currie (actor) (1928–2009), American actor
Michael Currie (politician) (born 1955), Canadian politician
Michael Currie (footballer), English footballer

See also
Michael Curry (disambiguation)